Dionisio Carreras (9 October 1890 – 16 July 1949) was a Spanish long-distance runner. He competed in the marathon at the 1924 Summer Olympics.

References

External links
 

1890 births
1949 deaths
Athletes (track and field) at the 1924 Summer Olympics
Spanish male long-distance runners
Spanish male marathon runners
Olympic athletes of Spain
Sportspeople from Zaragoza
19th-century Spanish people
20th-century Spanish people